Mustafa Üstündağ (born 11 February 1977) is a Turkish actor.

Life and career 
Üstündağ's father was a worker in Anadolu Glass Industry factory and his mother was a housewife. Her elder sister died when he was 5 years old. studied theatre at the Müjdat Gezen Art Center and then worked on stage at Kocaeli Regional Theater, Kartal Art Workshop, MSM Oyuncuları, and Pervasız Theatre. He first became noted with his role on ATV series Yersiz Yurtsuz alongside Ferdi Tayfur. He then played the role of an idealist named Talat in the movie Zincirbozan. In the movie Zeynep'in Sekiz Günü, he portrayed a trickster named Ali.
 
His breakthrough came with a role in the series Kurtlar Vadisi Pusu, in which he played the character of Muro. His performance in Muro: Nalet Olsun İçimdeki İnsan Sevgisine received critical acclaim. In 2017, he briefly appeared in the series Çukur as Kahraman Koçovalı. Between 2018–2020, he portrayed Boran Kayalı in Eşkıya Dünyaya Hükümdar Olmaz.

Filmography

Film 
 Aman Reis Duymasın - 2019
 Şeytan Tüyü - 2016
 Gulyabani - 2014
 Uzun Hikâye - 2012
 Kutsal Damacana 2: İtmen - 2010
 Vay Arkadaş - 2010
 Abimm - 2009
 Muro: Nalet Olsun İçimdeki İnsan Sevgisine - 2008
 Dilber'in Sekiz Günü
 Zeynep'in Sekiz Günü
 Zincirbozan - 2007
 Metropol Kabusu - 2003
 Neredesin Firuze - 2004
 Köçek - 2001
 Yolculuk - 2005
 Gülizar - 2004
 Emret Komutanım Şah Mat - 2007
 Ali'nin Sekiz Günü - 2008
 Vicdan
 Deli Dumrul - Kurtlar Kuşlar Aleminde

Television 
 Eşkıya Dünyaya Hükümdar Olmaz - Boran Kayalı (2018–2020)
 Tehlikeli Karım - Fırat Engin (2018)
 Çukur - Kahraman Koçovalı (2017)
 Bana Sevmeyi Anlat - Haşmet Tuğcu (2016)
 Muhteşem Yüzyıl: Kösem - Kara Davut Pasha (2016)
 Aşkın Kanunu - Çetin (2014-2015)
 Uğurlanmış Arzular - (2013)
 Neyin Eksik
 Merhamet - Sermet Karayel (2013–2014)
 Karanlıklar Çiçeği - (2012)
 İzmir Çetesi - Selami (2011)
 Cümbür Cemaat
 Kurtlar Vadisi Pusu - Muro (2007–2009)
 Keje
 Bedel 
 Yarım Elma (2002–2003)
 Yılan Hikâyesi 
 Bizim Aile
 Aşka Sürgün
 Dikkat Bebek Var
 Uy Başuma Gelenler - Cemal
 Emret Komutanım - (2005)
 Zincir Bozan
 Hayalet
 Hayat Bilgisi - (2004)
 Yedi Numara
 Yersiz Yurtsuz
 Cennet Mahallesi

Awards 
16th Sadri Alışık Awards, "Best Supporting Actor in a Musical or Comedy" - Vay Arkadaş (2011)

References

External links 
 
 

1977 births
Turkish male stage actors
Turkish male television actors
Turkish male film actors
People from Mersin
Living people